Angel Hotel or The Angel Hotel may refer to these places in the United Kingdom:

 Angel Hotel, Bury St Edmunds, Suffolk
 Angel Hotel, Cardiff, Wales
 Angel Hotel, Chippenham, Wiltshire
 Angel Hotel, Islington, London, now known as the Angel Corner House
 The Angel Hotel, Abergavenny, Wales
 The Angel Hotel, Monmouth, Wales